Danny Morgan (born 20 August 1974) is a former Australian rules footballer who played with Essendon in the Australian Football League (AFL).

Morgan came to Carlton in the 1990 National Draft but would only play for them at reserves level. While playing with the Preston Knights, he was picked up by Essendon with the 23rd selection of the 1993 Mid-Season Draft. An on-baller, he won the Essendon reserves best and fairest award in 1994, an award he would also win in 1996. In just his second senior game, against Adelaide in the 1995 AFL season, Morgan had 24 disposals and earned two Brownlow Medal votes.

He is the great-grandson of Fitzroy premiership captain Gerald Brosnan.

References

1974 births
Australian rules footballers from Victoria (Australia)
Essendon Football Club players
Northern Knights players
Living people